= Murbad, Fujairah =

Murbad
- Location within United Arab Emirates
- Coordinates: 25°19′33″N 56°7′55″E
- Country: United Arab Emirates
- Emirate: Fujairah
- Elevation: 411 m (1,348 ft)

Murbad is a settlement in Fujairah.
